Ricardo Daniel Noir Meyer (born 26 February 1987 in Villa Elisa, Entre Ríos) is an Argentine footballer, who plays as a forward for Uruguayan club Paysandú FC.

Career
Noir worked with his father before trialling for the Youth Divisions of Boca Juniors in 2003 and getting selected.

He made his professional debut on 17 May 2008 coming on as a substitute in a game against Racing Club, he scored the winning goal in the 5th minute of added time.

He played for Barcelona SC on a one-year loan from Boca Juniors for 2010 season.

On 4 July 2019, Noir joined Club Atlético Belgrano.

Honours

Club 
Boca Juniors
Recopa Sudamericana: 1
 2008
Argentine Primera División: 1
 2008 Apertura

Universidad Catolica
Chilean Primera División: 1
 2016-2017 Apertura
 Supercopa de Chile:  1'''
 2016

References

External links
 
 

1987 births
Living people
Argentine footballers
Argentine expatriate footballers
Argentine people of French descent
Argentine people of German descent
Sportspeople from Entre Ríos Province
Association football forwards
Boca Juniors footballers
Barcelona S.C. footballers
Club Deportivo Universidad Católica footballers
Club Atlético Huracán footballers
Atlético Tucumán footballers
Club Atlético Belgrano footballers
Newell's Old Boys footballers
Club Atlético Banfield footballers
Racing Club de Avellaneda footballers
San Martín de Tucumán footballers
C.D. Palmaflor del Trópico players
Gimnasia y Esgrima de Concepción del Uruguay footballers
Paysandú F.C. players
Argentine Primera División players
Chilean Primera División players
Ecuadorian Serie A players
Bolivian Primera División players
Primera Nacional players
Argentine expatriate sportspeople in Chile
Argentine expatriate sportspeople in Ecuador
Argentine expatriate sportspeople in Bolivia
Argentine expatriate sportspeople in Uruguay
Expatriate footballers in Chile
Expatriate footballers in Ecuador
Expatriate footballers in Bolivia
Expatriate footballers in Uruguay